Hat Trick is the third studio album by the American folk rock trio America, released on Warner Bros. Records in 1973. It peaked at number 28 on the Billboard album chart; it failed to go gold, whereas the group's first two releases had platinum sales. The album produced the single, "Muskrat Love", which reached number 67 on the Billboard singles chart and number 11 on the adult contemporary chart. That song would become a much bigger hit for Captain & Tennille three years later.

Production
America employed string arrangements for the first time on an album, with the assistance of Jim Ed Norman.

Reception

In his AllMusic review, Mike DeGagne wrote that the album faltered "mainly because the songs lacked the cordial folk-rock melodies and mindful songwriting that prevailed on the earlier releases. "She's Gonna Let You Down" and "Rainbow Song" are the album's best cuts, but banal offerings such as "Green Monkey", "Willow Tree Lullaby", and "Molten Love" have Bunnell and Peek straying off course, sounding stale and musically feeble." The Rough Guide to Rock called Hat Trick "one of country-rock's great lost albums." The Rolling Stone Album Guide deemed "Muskrat Love" "an early nadir in cuteness."

Track listing

Personnel

Performance
America
 Gerry Beckley - guitars, keyboards, lead and backing vocals
 Dewey Bunnell - guitars, lead and backing vocals
 Dan Peek - guitars, keyboards, lead and backing vocals
with:
David Dickey – bass guitar
Hal Blaine – drums, percussion (except "Muskrat Love")
Henry Diltz – banjo ("Submarine Ladies")
Billy Hinsche – backing vocals ("Hat Trick")
Bruce Johnston – backing vocals ("Hat Trick")
Lee Keifer – harmonica ("Submarine Ladies")
Robert Margouleff – synthesizer
Chester McCracken – congas
Jim Ed Norman – arrangements, piano ("She's Gonna Let You Down")
Tom Scott – saxophone ("Rainbow Song")
Joe Walsh – guitar ("Green Monkey")
Carl Wilson – backing vocals ("Hat Trick")
Lorene Yarnell – taps ("Hat Trick")

Production
Gerry Beckley – production
Dewey Bunnell – production
Gary Burden – art direction
Henry Diltz – photography
Lee Keifer – assistant engineer
Dan Peek – production
Mike D. Stone – Record Plant engineer

Charts

Certifications

References

1973 albums
America (band) albums
Warner Records albums
Albums recorded at Record Plant (Los Angeles)